Hanns Lippmann (1890–1929) was a German film producer of the silent era. Lippmann set up Gloria-Film AG  (later taken over by Ufa), and was closely associated with the director E.A. Dupont.

Selected filmography
 The Golem (1915)
 The Path of Death (1917)
 When the Dead Speak (1917)
 Prince Cuckoo (1919)
 Patience (1920)
 Whitechapel (1920)
 Hearts are Trumps (1920)
 The White Peacock (1920)
 The Vulture Wally (1921)
 Children of Darkness (1921)
 Murder Without Cause (1921)
 The Hunt for the Truth (1921)
 The Conspiracy in Genoa (1921)
 Man Overboard (1921)
 The False Dimitri (1922)
 The Green Manuela (1923)
 Inge Larsen (1923)
 The Wonderful Adventure (1924)
 Man Against Man (1924)
 Love Story (1925)
 When the Young Wine Blossoms (1927)

References

Bibliography
 St. Pierre, Paul Matthew. E.A. Dupont and his Contribution to British Film: Varieté, Moulin Rouge, Piccadilly, Atlantic, Two Worlds, Cape Forlorn. Fairleigh Dickinson University Press, 2010.

External links

1890 births
1929 deaths
German film producers